This page describes relatives of Jogaila, who was Grand Duke of Lithuania, and, known under the name Wladyslaw II Jagiello, king of Poland. Family relations up to two generations before him, and three generations after him are mentioned.

Family tree (grandparents to children)

Brothers
Half-brothers:
 Andrei of Polotsk (1325 – 12 August 1399), Duke of Polock (1342–1387), Pskov (1342–1348)
 Demetrius I Starszy (1327 – 12 August 1399 in the Battle of the Vorskla River), Duke of Bryansk (1356–1379 and 1388–1399)
 Constantine (died before 30 October 1390), Prince of Czartorysk. According to J. Tęgowski, he may be son of Koriat.
 Vladimir Olgerdovich (died after October 1398), Prince of Kiev (1362–1394), Kopyl, Sluck. Ancestor of Olelkovich and Belsky families.
 Fiodor (Theodore; died in 1399), Prince of Rylsk (1370–1399), Ratnie (1387–1394), Bryansk (1393)
Brothers:
 Skirgaila (baptized Ivan;  – 11 January 1397 in Kiev), Duke of Trakai (1382–1395), Kiev (1395–1397), regent of Lithuania
 Dymitr Korybut (after 1350 – after 1404), Prince of Novgorod-Seversky (1386–1392/93)
 Lengvenis (baptised Simon; died after 19 June 1431), Prince of Mstislavl, regent of Great Novgorod
 Karigaila (baptized Cassimir; after 1350–1390), Prince of Mstislavl
 Vygantas (baptized Alexander; after 1350 – 28 June 1392), Prince of Kernavė
 Švitrigaila (baptized Boleslaw;  – 10 February 1452 in Lutsk), Grand Duke of Lithuania (1430–1432), ruler of Volynia (1437–1452)

Sisters
Fiedora, wife of Sviatoslav of Karachev
Agrypina (baptized Mary; died in 1393), wife of Boris of Suzdal
Kenna (baptized Joan;  – 27 April 1368), wife of Casimir IV, Duke of Pomerania
Helen (after 1350 – 15 September 1438), wife of Vladimir the Bold
Maria (born after 1350), wife of Vaidila and David of Gorodets
Wilheida (baptized Catherine; after 1350 – after 4 April 1422), wife of John II, Duke of Mecklenburg-Stargard
Alexandra of Masovia (after 1350 – 19 June 1434), wife of Siemowit IV, Duke of Masovia
Jadwiga (after 1350 – after 1407), wife of Jan III of Oświęcim

Sons
King Wladislaus III of Poland (1424 - 1444)
Casimir (1426 - 1427)
King Casimir IV of Poland (1427 - 1492)

Daughters
Elzbieta-Bonifacja (1399 - 1399)
Jadwiga of Lithuania (1408 - 1431)

Genealogical tree (rulers of the Jagiellon dynasty)

The Jagiellon dynasty started with Jogaila and had four generations of rulers, who ruled in several European countries:

References

Jogaila
Gediminids